The 2018–19 Montana Grizzlies basketball team represented the University of Montana during the 2018–19 NCAA Division I men's basketball season. The Grizzlies, led by fifth-year head coach Travis DeCuire, played their home games at Dahlberg Arena in Missoula, Montana as members of the Big Sky Conference. Finishing the season 26–9 overall, 16–4 in Big Sky play, the Grizzlies won the Big Sky regular season championship. As the No. 1 seed in the Big Sky tournament, they defeated Sacramento State, Weber State, and Eastern Washington to win the tournament, and earned the Big Sky's automatic bid to the NCAA tournament.

Given a No. 15 seed in the West Region of the NCAA Tournament, Montana was defeated by Michigan in the first round for the second consecutive year.

Previous season
The Grizzlies finished the 2017–18 season 26–8, 16–2 in Big Sky play to win the Big Sky regular season championship. They defeated North Dakota, Northern Colorado, and Eastern Washington to be champions of the Big Sky tournament. They earned the Big Sky's automatic bid to the NCAA tournament where they lost in the first round to Michigan.

Offseason

Departures

Incoming transfers

2018 recruiting class

2019 recruiting class

2020 recruiting class

Roster

Schedule and results

|-
!colspan=9 style=| Exhibition

|-
!colspan=9 style=| Non-conference regular season

|-
!colspan=9 style=| Big Sky regular season

|-
!colspan=9 style=| Big Sky tournament

|-
!colspan=9 style=| NCAA tournament

See also
2018–19 Montana Lady Griz basketball team

References

Montana Grizzlies basketball seasons
Montana
Montana Grizzlies basketball
Montana Grizzlies basketball
Montana